Roy Trantham (February 10, 1941March 17, 2014) was an American stock car racing driver. A veteran short-track driver, he also competed in five NASCAR Grand National Series races.

Career
A native of Asheville, North Carolina, Trantham was a veteran of short-track racing in the southern Appalachians, and made his debut in the NASCAR Grand National Series in the 1968 Southern 500 at Darlington Raceway. He finished 34th in the event, and went on to run four more Grand National races that year, posting a best finish of tenth at Martinsville Speedway.

Following his racing career Trantam moved first to the United States Virgin Islands, then to Palm City, Florida, where following a battle with leukemia he died on March 17, 2014.

References

External links

1941 births
2014 deaths
Sportspeople from Asheville, North Carolina
Racing drivers from North Carolina
NASCAR drivers
People from Palm City, Florida